Kyaw Aye (born 28 February 1939) is a Burmese former sports shooter. He competed in the 50 metre rifle, prone event at the 1964 Summer Olympics. He also competed at the 1966 Asian Games.

References

External links
 

1939 births
Living people
Burmese male sport shooters
Olympic shooters of Myanmar
Shooters at the 1964 Summer Olympics
Place of birth missing (living people)
Shooters at the 1966 Asian Games
Asian Games competitors for Myanmar